María Mercedes Peñas Domingo (born November 18, 1968) is a Spanish–Costa Rican political scientist and specialist in international development in Latin America. Peñas, the longtime partner of former Costa Rican President Luis Guillermo Solís, held the position of First Lady of Costa Rica from May 8, 2014 to May 8, 2018. Peñas and Solis live under civil partnership.

Biography
Peñas was born in Madrid, Spain, on November 18, 1968. She first visited Costa Rica in August 1991 to attend the University for Peace (UPEACE), where she obtained a master's degree in International Relations, Peace, and Development Cooperation. She met Luis Guillermo Solís, her future partner who is ten years older than her, while studying for her master's at UPEACE. Solis was one of her professors.

Peñas spent two years studying at UPEACE in Costa Rica before returning to Spain after completing her master's degree. Two years later, she returned to Costa Rica to accept a job at the Inter-American Institute for Cooperation on Agriculture's (IICA) Department of External Affairs. Additionally, she has worked as a consultant for the Rainforest Alliance, European Union and the United Nations.

Peñas has worked for DEMUCA, the financial branch of the Spanish Agency for International Development Cooperation (AECID), since 1997. She is now a naturalized citizen of Costa Rica.

Mercedes Peñas Domingo and Luis Guillermo Solís have dated since 2006. The couple, who are not married, have one daughter, Inés Solís Peñas. Solís has five children from his previous marriage to Nancy Richards.

Peñas kept a low profile during much of the 2014 presidential election. She and Luis Guillermo Solís, the then-candidate of the Citizens' Action Party, made their first joint appearance at a press conference on March 8, 2014, to discuss Johnny Araya Monge, Solis' opponent who had dropped out of the campaign.

Mercedes Peñas Domingo became First Lady of Costa Rica on May 8, 2014, when Solis was inaugurated President. She succeeded José María Rico, the outgoing First Gentleman of Costa Rica. On her Facebook, Peñas describes herself as "Mujer, madre, compañera y Primera Dama de la República de Costa Rica" (Woman, mother, companion and First Lady of the Republic of Costa Rica).

Peñas accompanied her husband on her first official visit to her native Spain on March 17 and 18, 2015.

References

External links
Presidency of Costa Rica: First Lady Mercedes Peñas Domingo (Spanish)

Living people
1968 births
First ladies and gentlemen of Costa Rica
Costa Rican political scientists
Spanish political scientists
Spanish emigrants to Costa Rica
People from Madrid
Women political scientists